The 2009 European Speed Skating Championships were held at the indoor ice rink of the Thialf in Heerenveen (the Netherlands) on 9–11 January 2009.

Men's championships

Allround results 

NQ = Not qualified for the 10000 m (only the best 12 are qualified)
DQ = Disqualified

Source: ISU

Women's championships

Allround results 

NQ = Not qualified for the 5000 m (only the best 12 are qualified)
DQ = Disqualified

Source: ISU

Rules 
All 24 participating skaters are allowed to skate the first three distances; 12 skaters may take part on the fourth distance. These 12 skaters are determined by taking the standings on the longest of the first three distances, as well as the samalog standings after three distances, and comparing these lists as follows:

 Skaters among the top 12 on both lists are qualified.
 To make up a total of 12, skaters are then added in order of their best rank on either list. Samalog standings take precedence over the longest-distance standings in the event of a tie.

See also 
 2009 World Allround Speed Skating Championships

References

External links 
 Resultaten op IsuResults.eu

European Speed Skating Championships, 2009
2009 European Allround
European Allround, 2009
European Speed Skating Championships, 2009
2009 in Dutch sport